Arnold Stuart Zuboff (born January 1946) is an American philosopher who has worked on topics such as personal identity, philosophy of mind, ethics, metaphysics, epistemology and the philosophy of probability. He is the original formulator of the Sleeping Beauty problem and a view analogous to open individualism—the position that there is one subject of experience, who is everyone—which he calls "universalism".

Education and career 
Zuboff received a BA in philosophy from the University of Connecticut, in 1968 and later a PhD in philosophy from Princeton University in 2009. Zuboff lectured at the University College London's Department of Philosophy from 1974, till his retirement in 2011; he is now a Senior Honorary Research Associate.

Selected works

Articles

Books

Videos

See also
 The Mind's I, a collection of essays on philosophy of mind, edited by Douglas Hofstadter and Daniel Dennett, in which Zuboff's short story "The Story of a Brain" is featured

References

External links 

Arnold Zuboff at PhilPapers
Arnold Zuboff at ResearchGate
Arnold Zuboff at YouTube

1946 births
Living people
20th-century American philosophers
21st-century American philosophers
Academics of University College London
American ethicists
Epistemologists
Metaphysicians
Philosophers of identity
Philosophers of mind
Philosophers of probability
Princeton University alumni
University of Connecticut alumni